José Carlos Bru Villarreal (born 9 June 1928) was a Mexican basketball player. He competed in the men's tournament at the 1952 Summer Olympics.

References

1928 births
Living people
Mexican men's basketball players
Olympic basketball players of Mexico
Basketball players at the 1952 Summer Olympics
Place of birth missing (living people)